Walter Ellsworth "Scrapper" Bachman Sr. (March 19, 1879 – November 11, 1958) was an American college football player and coach. A player at Lafayette College from 1899 until 1901, Bachman developed the "roving center" position for college football. He is regarded as one of the best offensive linemen in Lafayette history. In 1900 he was given second-team All-American honors by Walter Camp and was one of the first players to be given the honor from a school outside of Yale, Harvard, Princeton and Penn. He did also make several other All-American lists that season. In 1901, he was the fourth leading scorer for the Leopards with 25 goals from touchdowns (this was before modern scoring was implemented).

Biography
Bachman was born in 1880 and raised in Phillipsburg, New Jersey. After graduation, he served as an assistant football coach at Allegheny College in Meadville, Pennsylvania. He then served as the seventh head coach of the Texas A&M Aggies from 1905 to 1906 finishing with a record of 13–3.

Bachman also had a career in professional football. In 1902 he played for the Philadelphia Phillies of the first National Football League. After the season ended, he became a member of the "New York team" during the World Series of Football The team was heavily favored to win the 5 team tournament, and featured professional football stars Blondy Wallace, Charlie Gelbert and Ben Roller. However, the team was eliminated in the opening match in a 5–0 loss to the Syracuse Athletic Club.

In 1906 he became a yardmaster for the Lehigh Valley Railroad until his retirement in 1944. He died on November 11, 1958, at Easton Hospital in Easton, Pennsylvania.

Legacy
Bachman was inducted in the Lafayette Maroon Hall of Fame in 1977.

Head coaching record

References

External links
 

1879 births
1958 deaths
19th-century players of American football
American football centers
Allegheny Gators football coaches
Lafayette Leopards football players
New York (World Series of Football) players
Philadelphia Phillies (NFL) players
Texas A&M Aggies football coaches
All-American college football players
Yardmasters
People from Phillipsburg, New Jersey
Coaches of American football from New Jersey
Players of American football from New Jersey